Baatarkhüügiin Battsetseg (born 21 January 1976) is a Mongolian long-distance runner. She competed in the women's 5000 metres at the 2000 Summer Olympics.

References

External links
 

1976 births
Living people
Athletes (track and field) at the 2000 Summer Olympics
Mongolian female long-distance runners
Olympic athletes of Mongolia
Place of birth missing (living people)